The 2020 New Zealand Derby was a Group I horse race which took place at Ellerslie Racecourse on Saturday 29 February 2020. It was the 145th running of the New Zealand Derby, and it was won by Sherwood Forest. 

Sherwood Forest was bred by the Goodson & Perron Family Trust and was sold for A$100,000 at the Magic Millions Gold Coast Yearling Sale. He is owned by the Goodson & Perron Family Trust, Calder Bloodstock Ltd and Deborah Martin. Sherwood Forest is trained by Tony Pike in Cambridge, New Zealand.

Sherwood Forest had made an impact in the spring, winning two races including the War Decree Stakes at Group Three level in October, and he also finished third in the New Zealand 2000 Guineas in November. But trainer Tony Pike believed he would come into his own over longer distances later in the season.

The 2020 Derby had been billed as a two-horse battle of the sexes. The filly Two Illicit had scored a seven-length win in the Waikato Guineas, while the well-bred gelding Dragon Leap easily won the Avondale Guineas. They disputed favouritism throughout the two weeks leading into the Derby, and no other runner was in single-figure odds.

Coming around the home turn, that two-horse showdown appeared to be happening as Dragon Leap and Two Illicit surged to the lead together. But Sherwood Forest stayed with them and began to poke through in between them. Ridden by Melbourne-based jockey Michael Walker, his stamina shone through as he pulled clear in the last 200 metres to win by a length and a quarter. Two Illicit held on for second, with the fast-finishing Scorpz snatching third from a tiring Dragon Leap.

The time for the Derby was 2:26.77, which was the fastest since 1998 and the third-fastest since 1972.

It was a third Derby victory for Walker, who had previously won on Military Move in 2010 and on Puccini in 2014.

It was Pike's second Derby, having won the race in 2016 with Rangipo.

Race details
 Sponsor: Vodafone New Zealand
 Prize money: NZ$1,000,000
 Track: Good
 Number of runners: 16
 Winner's time: 2:26.77

Full result

Winner's details
Further details of the winner, Sherwood Forest:

 Foaled: 1 September 2016
 Sire: Fastnet Rock; Dam: Chasing Mammon (Giant's Causeway)
 Owner: Goodson & Perron Family Trust, Calder Bloodstock Ltd & Deborah Martin
 Trainer: Tony Pike
 Breeder: Goodson & Perron Family Trust
 Starts: 11
 Wins: 4
 Seconds: 0
 Thirds: 2
 Earnings: $737,875

The road to the Derby
Early-season appearances prior to running in the 2020 Derby.

 Sherwood Forest – 5th Hawke's Bay Guineas, 1st War Decree Stakes, 3rd New Zealand 2000 Guineas, 4th Auckland Guineas, 3rd Avondale Guineas
 Two Illicit – 1st Trevor Eagle Memorial, 2nd Eight Carat Classic, 1st Royal Stakes, 1st Waikato Guineas
 Scorpz – 1st Wellington Stakes, 1st 3YO Salver, 2nd Avondale Guineas
 Dragon Leap – 2nd Trevor Eagle Memorial, 1st Auckland Guineas, 1st Avondale Guineas
 Den Bosch – 7th Avondale Guineas
 Platinum Road – 4th Waikato Guineas
 Lochwinnoch – 4th 3YO Salver, 11th Avondale Guineas
 Dalmatia – 9th Avondale Guineas
 Tibetan – 3rd Wellington Stakes, 2nd 3YO Salver, 5th Karaka Million 3YO Classic, 4th Avondale Guineas
 Peloton – 5th Wellington Stakes, 7th 3YO Salver, 5th Waikato Guineas

Subsequent Group 1 wins
Subsequent wins at Group 1 level by runners in the 2020 New Zealand Derby.

 Two Illicit – winner of the 2021 Captain Cook Stakes

See also
 2021 New Zealand Derby
 2019 New Zealand Derby
 2018 New Zealand Derby
 2017 New Zealand Derby
 2016 New Zealand Derby
 2015 New Zealand Derby
 2014 New Zealand Derby
 2013 New Zealand Derby
 2012 New Zealand Derby
 2011 New Zealand Derby
 2010 New Zealand Derby
  Recent winners of major NZ 3 year old races
 Desert Gold Stakes
 Hawke's Bay Guineas
 Karaka Million
 Levin Classic
 New Zealand 1000 Guineas
 New Zealand 2000 Guineas
 New Zealand Oaks

References

New Zealand Derby
2020 in New Zealand sport
New Zealand Derby
New Zealand Derby